The 1989–90 Northern Premier League season was the 22nd in the history of the Northern Premier League, a football competition in England. Teams were divided into two divisions: the Premier and the First. It was known as the HFS Loans League for sponsorship reasons.

Premier Division

The Premier Division featured two new teams:

 Colne Dynamoes promoted as champions from Division One
 Bishop Auckland promoted as runners up from Division One

League table

Results

Division One

The Division One featured three new teams:

 Worksop Town relegated from Premier Division
 Rossendale United promoted as champions of the NWCFL Division One
 Emley promoted as champions of the NCEL Premier Division

League table

Promotion and relegation 

In the twenty-second season of the Northern Premier League Colne Dynamoes should have been promoted as champions, but folded at the end of the season, so 2nd placed Gateshead took their place in the Football Conference while relegated Chorley took Gateshead's place. Meanwhile, Caernarfon Town and Rhyl were relegated; these two sides were replaced by First Division winners Leek Town and second placed Droylsden. Eastwood Hanley and Penrith left the First Division at the end of the season and were replaced by newly admitted Bridlington Town and Warrington Town.

Cup Results
Challenge Cup:

Hyde United 1–0 Gateshead

President's Cup:

Fleetwood Town bt. Witton Albion

Northern Premier League Shield: Between Champions of NPL Division One and Winners of the NPL Cup.

Leek Town bt. Hyde United

References

External links 
 Northern Premier League Tables at RSSSF

Northern Premier League seasons
6